Can't Take that Away from Me is the first mixtape by American singer JoJo. It was self-released by the singer for streaming and free download exclusively through Rap-Up.com on September 7, 2010. The mixtape was to serve as a prequel to her third studio album, which at the time was titled All I Want Is Everything (her third studio album, Mad Love, would eventually be released in 2016). JoJo wrote or co-wrote all but one of the mixtape's 11 tracks, which she worked on with a variety of producers, including Beau Dozier, Theron "Neff-U" Feemster, Jordan Gatsby, Chad Hugo, Kenna, The Messengers, Jeremiah McConico, Oak, and State of Emergency. JoJo wanted to upload her mixtapes (Can't Take That Away from Me and Agápē) on streaming services like Spotify, but was unable to do so.

Background
Following the release of "Anything"—the final single from her second album The High Road—in late 2007, JoJo stated that she had been writing and working with producers for her third studio album, but would not go into the studio until early 2008. In mid-2008, JoJo revealed that the album, previously titled All I Want Is Everything, was scheduled for a fourth quarter release that year, to coincide with her eighteenth birthday in December. However, the album's release was delayed due to issues with her record label, Da Family Entertainment, which had encountered financial difficulties. Eventually, JoJo decided to sue the label in order to be released from her contract. JoJo won the case, and her label Blackground Records reached a deal with Interscope Records for distribution. To prepare for the release of All I Want Is Everything, then retitled Jumping Trains and now untitled without a release date, JoJo decided to release a mixtape in 2010.

Recording and composition
In late 2009, JoJo stated that she would be working on her first mixtape with producers Clinton Sparks and Chester French. In January 2010, JoJo shot a viral video for a track called "In the Dark". The video's release was then delayed because JoJo wanted to make sure that the timing was right, as its direction was so different than anything that she had done before. The mixtape's black-and-white cover was designed by Mowie Inc. and photographed by Steven Taylor.

The mixtape's recording took place over one year. JoJo thought that it was more experimental than her album because she "was able to explore the full spectrum of things that interest me and inspire me musically", which resulted in a broad range of sounds, such as pop, hip-hop and soulful records. Compared to All I Want Is Everything, which comprised pop records and radio hits, the mixtape allowed JoJo to be "more soulful, incorporate live instruments, and say things that I wouldn't normally say on an album. I was just able to take more of a risk." In addition, while the album has a cohesive sound and a common thread like a continuous body of work, the mixtape jumps around and is "all over the place, just like me."

Promotion
The track, "In the Dark", premiered on August 30, 2010 on Rap-Up.com. Produced by Jordan Gatsby and co-written by JoJo and Gatsby, the singer thought that the song was unlike anything that she had previously released because "it's a very sensual record and there's an undertone of sadness to it." The track's "experimental sound" was not meant to reflect the material on All I Want Is Everything, but was released as "a thank you to her loyal fans who've stuck by her throughout the years". The song's viral video was released on September 8. Directed by Nicole Ehrlich and Clarence Fuller in New York, the scenes were originally shot in color, but it was later decided that black-and-white imagery would best convey the lyrics and mood. Rap-Up wrote that "JoJo sheds her good girl image for a more risqué one in the viral video" as "the blindfolded singer gives into her physical desires in the provocative clip." The song also began to pick up radio airplay after the release of its music video.

Live performances
JoJo has performed the song "Boy Without a Heart" several times since the release of the mixtape. She performed the song for the first time at 4th annual Jordin Sparks experience in North Texas on February 2, 2011. She then performed the song at the Girls Who Rock 2011 Concert benefiting She's the First where she also debut her the song "Jumping Trains" from her upcoming third album of the same name. She has also performed the song on the Joe Jonas & Jay Sean Tour as their opening act and has performed it a few other times.

Concept
The mixtape's title, Can't Take That Away from Me, was personal to JoJo because it reflected what she was going through "professionally as well as personally. Starting with the fact that I want to release music and you can't really take what comes naturally to me, away from me." Upon the mixtape's release, JoJo said that "in releasing this mixtape, I'm affirming that even though some have tried they CAN'T TAKE THAT AWAY FROM ME. What is THAT? My voice, my spirit, my drive, my dreams. As you listen to these songs, I hope that they make your head nod, your mind tick, your emotions move, your belly laugh, and maybe elicit a 'stanky face' or something."

Impact
Since the release on Rap-Up.com, the mixtape has been downloaded more than 400,000 times.

Track listing
Writing and production credits adapted from Bandcamp.

References

External links
 The Mixtape on Audiomack
 The Mixtape on Bandcamp

2010 mixtape albums
JoJo (singer) albums
Albums produced by Chad Hugo
Albums produced by Kenna
Albums produced by the Messengers (producers)
Albums produced by Theron Feemster
Interscope Records albums